Sebastián Salomón (born 12 December 1978) is an Argentine football midfielder. He currently plays for Deportivo Roca in Argentina.

Club career 

Salomón began his professional playing career in 2000 with Los Andes, he made his debut in a 2–1 away win over Racing Club on 6 August 2000. After Los Andes were relegated he had a short stint with Club Almagro before joining Lanús in 2002 where he played until 2009, where he played 197 games for the club scoring 6 goals.

In 2005 Salomón had a short loan spell with Paraguayan side Olimpia.

Salomón was part of the squad that won the Apertura 2007 tournament which was Lanús' first league championship.

In 2009, he joined Godoy Cruz. In 2010, he joined Aris Limassol and in the summer of 2010 the team released him.
He played in Uruguay and now is back in Argentina for Deportivo Roca.

Titles

References

External links
 Argentine Primera statistics

1978 births
Living people
People from General Roca
Argentine footballers
Argentine expatriate footballers
Association football midfielders
Argentine Primera División players
Cypriot First Division players
Club Atlético Los Andes footballers
Club Almagro players
Club Atlético Lanús footballers
Rampla Juniors players
Club Olimpia footballers
Godoy Cruz Antonio Tomba footballers
Aris Limassol FC players
Expatriate footballers in Paraguay
Expatriate footballers in Uruguay
Expatriate footballers in Cyprus